Puranchandra Pandit, more commonly known as Pandit Puranchandra and Puranchand "Gavaiya", (1929 – 1991) was an Indian classical singer of the Mewati gharana. He is known for being first cousins to and collaborators with Pandit Jasraj, Pandit Pratap Narayan, and Pandit Maniram. He also studied for some time with members of the Agra Gharana.

References

1929 births
1991 deaths
Hindustani singers
20th-century Indian male classical singers
Indian music educators
Singers from Uttar Pradesh
Mewati gharana
20th-century Khyal singers